Libau may refer to:

 Libau, Manitoba, a community in Canada
 Libau, the German name for Liepāja, Latvia
 SS Libau, a ship renamed Aud, which attempted to bring arms to Ireland in 1916 under German auspices to aid in the Easter Rising